The men's 30 km points race competition at the 2002 Asian Games was held on 7 October at the Geumjeong Velodrome.

Schedule
All times are Korea Standard Time (UTC+09:00)

Results

References

External links 
Results

Track Men points race